Olaf Swantee (born 31 January 1966) is a Dutch businessman, and the former Chief Executive of EE Limited (formerly Everything Everywhere), a British telecommunications company.

Early life
He is the second son of a legal professional.

He went to school in Hilversum in North Holland at the Nieuwe Lyceum Hilversum Gymnasium. He went to the University of Amsterdam to study Economics. Later he did an MBA at EAP (École des Affaires de Paris) in Paris, Berlin, and Oxford, which became ESCP Europe, in 1989. At Oxford he took up rowing.

Career
He started with Compaq, then moved to the Digital Equipment Corporation, which was bought by Compaq in 1998. HP bought Compaq in 2002.

Orange
He joined Orange in 2007.
He served as Head of Mobile Operations of Europe & Middle East of France Telecom at Orange Home UK Limited since August 2007 and served as its Executive Vice President of Europe of France Telecom.

Everything Everywhere
He became Chief Executive of EE on 1 September 2011. EE has a main office in Paddington. EE has around 580 stores, and is known for its cinema adverts with Kevin Bacon. In January 2015 it was announced that BT would buy EE for £12.5bn. Everything Everywhere had been formed on 1 July 2010. On 4 January 2016 EE announced that Swantee would be standing down as CEO after the acquisition by BT was completed.

Sunrise
From 9 May 2016 to 3 January 2020 Swantee was CEO of Swiss telecommunications company Sunrise.

Personal life
He has a Swedish wife. His son Gustav, who is currently studying at university of St. Gallen in Switzerland, and two daughters were born in Switzerland (Zurich). He lives in the London Borough of Richmond upon Thames.

See also
 Marc Bolland, Dutch chief executive of M&S since 2010
 Dame Patricia Hodgson, Chairman since 2014 of Ofcom

References

External links
 EE
 4G networks in August 2012

1966 births
Businesspeople in telecommunications
Dutch chief executives in the technology industry
ESCP Europe alumni
Orange S.A.
People from Hilversum
People from the London Borough of Richmond upon Thames
University of Amsterdam alumni
Living people